Callipielus salasi is a species of moth of the family Hepialidae. It was discovered in Temuco, Chile at the Carillanca Experimental Station. It was discovered and named by Gaden Sutherland Robinson in his 1977 publication "A Taxonomic Revision of the Genus Callipielus" and readdressed in his 1983 publication "Ghost Moths of South America".

References

External links
Hepialidae genera

Moths described in 1977
Hepialidae
Endemic fauna of Chile